The Attorney General of the Gambia is a cabinet-level position in the Gambia responsible for providing legal advice to the Gambian government and appearing on its behalf in the courts of the land. In recent years, the post has been held in conjunction with that of Minister of Justice, who is the head of the Ministry of Justice and responsible for legal affairs. The current Attorney General is Dawda A. Jallow.

History 

The office of Attorney General has been described by Hassan Bubacar Jallow as having "great antiquity" in the Gambia. Its origins can be traced back to the creation of the office of King's Advocate in 1831, formed to head the Legal Adviser's Office. From 1831 to 1837, Andrew Hunter, the Colonial Secretary, performed the office as part of his duties. After his death from yellow fever in April 1837, Thomas Lewis Ingram became the acting King's Advocate. In 1839, following the accession of Queen Victoria, Richard Pine was appointed as the Queen's Advocate. In 1841, John Iles Mantell was appointed as the Queen's Advocate, serving until 1847, when he became Chief Justice. In the early 1860s, Alexander Ingram was the Queen's Advocate. From 1861 to 1866, Thomas Brown served as Queen's Advocate.

The first Attorney General of the Gambia, William Richard Townsend, was appointed in 1902. The Legal Adviser's Office was staffed with Legal Assistants, who assisted the Attorney General in his work. The first of these was Donald Kingdom, who went on to become Chief Justice of Nigeria in 1929. From 1913 to 1945, these Legal Assistants were known as Legal Advisers to the Crown. In 1945, the Legal Adviser's Office was re-designated as the Crown Law Office, with the Attorney General remaining as its head.

The office underwent a period of growth. In 1953, only the Attorney General and a single Legal Adviser were listed as law officers in the Gambia, but by 1966, an Attorney General, Solicitor General, Registrar General and Crown Counsel were all recorded. 1966 was also the first time a Solicitor General was provided for the Gambia. The 1965 constitution, upon independence, provided for the Attorney General to be the principal legal adviser to the Gambian government and also stated that it should be a full government minister. The constitution also created the independent office of Director of Public Prosecutions to oversee criminal prosecutions.

In 1968, a Ministry of Justice was created, with the new title of the department becoming the Attorney General's Chambers and Ministry of Justice. The 1970 republican constitution made the Attorney General a voting member of the House of Representatives.

Eligibility and functions

Eligibility 

According to Section 71 (2) of the Constitution of the Gambia, the Attorney General must be a "legal practitioner of at least five years standing" at the Gambian bar.

Functions 

The role of Attorney General is a civil service role and an ex officio member of the cabinet. However, when the portfolio of Minister of Justice came into being in 1968, it was seen as prudent to combine the two roles.

Section 72 (2) of the Constitution states that the Attorney General "shall be the principal legal adviser to the Government and shall have the right of audience in all courts in the Gambia." Section 84 (1) states that the Director of Public Prosecutions (DPP) must seek approval from the Attorney General before initiating proceedings, and Section 85 (4) states that the DPP is subject "to the direction or control" of the Attorney General.

Section 82 (2) says that the Attorney General shall automatically be granted a position on any committee on the exercise of the prerogative of mercy. Section 137 A (4) grants the Attorney General a position on the Cadi Appeals Selection Committee.

Assistants 

The principal assistant to the Attorney General is the Solicitor General, who is authorised to deputise for the Attorney General when required. Also, the Director of Public Prosecutions can exercise some of the Attorney General's powers, most notably discontinuing court cases (nolle prosequi). There are six directorates in the Ministry of Justice that the Attorney General, as Minister of Justice, also has control over.

List of attorneys general (1965–present)

See also 

 Justice ministry
 Politics of the Gambia

References 

Lists of government ministers of the Gambia
Government of the Gambia
Attorneys General of the Gambia